Harthorne Nathaniel Wingo (October 9, 1947 – January 23, 2021) was an American professional basketball player.

Early life and career 
A 6'6" forward born in Tryon, North Carolina and from Friendship Junior College, Wingo (also known as "Wingo Harthorne") played four seasons (1972–1976) in the National Basketball Association as a member of the New York Knicks. He averaged 4.8 points and 3.5 rebounds in his career and won a league championship in 1973.
After the 1975-76 season he moved to Italy and played with Pallacanestro Cantu (1976–1978), with whom he won the European Cup Winner's Cup twice, and Superga Mestre (1978–1980). He died in New York City in 2021 at the age of 73.

Notes

External links

1947 births
2021 deaths
20th-century African-American sportspeople
21st-century African-American people
African-American basketball players
Allentown Jets players
American expatriate basketball people in Italy
American men's basketball players
Basket Mestre 1958 players
Basketball players from North Carolina
Junior college men's basketball players in the United States
New York Knicks players
Pallacanestro Cantù players
People from Tryon, North Carolina
Power forwards (basketball)
Undrafted National Basketball Association players